Herbert William Lyons (30 September 1888 – 1 September 1958) was an Australian politician who represented the South Australian House of Assembly multi-member seat of Barossa from 1933 to 1938 for the Liberal and Country League.

References

1888 births
1958 deaths
Members of the South Australian House of Assembly
Liberal and Country League politicians
20th-century Australian politicians